Otsego County Courthouse is a historic courthouse building in Cooperstown, Otsego County, New York.  It is a -story, brick-and-stone structure on a foundation of coursed ashlar.  It was designed by Archimedes Russell (1840–1915) and built in 1880.  It features a gable roof, projecting pavilions, and a tower with supporting pavilion and overhanging top stage.  The front facade of the building is dominated by a large stained glass window.

It was listed on the National Register of Historic Places in 1972.

References

External links

Welcome to Otsego County's Website

Courthouses on the National Register of Historic Places in New York (state)
County courthouses in New York (state)
Government buildings completed in 1880
Buildings and structures in Otsego County, New York
National Register of Historic Places in Otsego County, New York